Alonzo Michael Morphy (November 23, 1798 – November 22, 1856) was a lawyer serving as Attorney General of Louisiana from 1828 to 1830, and a justice of the Louisiana Supreme Court from August 31, 1839 to March 19, 1846.

Biography
Born in Charleston, South Carolina, Morphy held Spanish nationality and was of Spanish, Portuguese, and Irish ancestry. Morphy moved to Louisiana, and read law under Edward Livingston. He served in the state legislature, and was also Attorney General of Louisiana. Morphy married Louise Thérèse Félicité Thelcide Le Carpentier, the musically talented daughter of a prominent French Creole family. His home was an atmosphere of genteel civility and culture where chess and music were the typical highlights of a Sunday home gathering. His son, Paul Morphy, is considered one of the greatest chess players of all time.

External links
 Former Home of Louisiana Supreme Court Judge Alonzo Morphy & His Son, World-Famous Chess Champion, Paul Morphy

References

1798 births
1856 deaths
American chess players
American people of Irish descent
American people of Portuguese descent
American people of Spanish descent
Louisiana Attorneys General
Justices of the Louisiana Supreme Court
Members of the Louisiana State Legislature
Lawyers from Charleston, South Carolina
Politicians from Charleston, South Carolina
U.S. state supreme court judges admitted to the practice of law by reading law
Lawyers from New Orleans
19th-century chess players
19th-century American politicians
19th-century American judges
19th-century American lawyers